François Cuzin is a professor at the University of Nice, Sophia-Antipolis. In 1988 he won the Richard Lounsbery Award for "his original contributions in the elucidation of the mechanisms involved in malignant cell transformation, in particular, demonstration of the necessary contribution of two oncogenes."

References 

20th-century French biologists
Living people
Academic staff of Côte d'Azur University
Year of birth missing (living people)
Richard-Lounsbery Award laureates
Place of birth missing (living people)